Abdalong of Marseilles was a bishop of the Diocese of Marseille in the 8th century during the reign of Charles Martel. He has a popular cult without official recognition which holds an informal feast day for him on March 1.

See also

Notes

References
Holweck, F. G. A Biographical Dictionary of the Saints. St. Louis, MO: B. Herder Book Co., 1924.

Year of birth unknown
Year of death unknown
Bishops of Marseille
8th-century Frankish bishops
8th-century Frankish saints